Michelle Davis or Michele Davis may refer to:

 Michele Davis, American businessperson and U.S. Department of the Treasury official
 Michele Davis Macfarlane (born 1948), American horse trainer
 Michelle Davis (blogger), an appropriator of Black veganism
 Michelle Davis (politician), winner of the 2020 Indiana House of Representatives election for District 58
 Michelle Davis, an executive producer of the Disney television series So Weird
 Michelle Davis, a character in the 2017 film The Stray

See also
 Michael Davis (disambiguation)
 Michelle Davison (born 1979), American diver